Vasile Hutopila born March 17, 1953, in Izvoarele Sucevei (Ізвори), Suceava County, Bukovina, Romania, is a contemporary Romanian painter of Ukrainian ethnicity. His works belong to impressionism.

Awards 

1983 - 3rd place at Cântarea României festival - the county final
May 20, 1985 - 1st place at the Participation, development, peace art festival in Brașov, awarded by the Committee of Socialist Education and Culture of Brașov County
1985 - 2nd place at Cântarea României festival - the county final
1985 - 2nd place at the most important Romanian arts festival under the communist rule, Cântarea României, in the national final, representing Brașov County
1987 - 2nd place in the national final of Cântarea României festival, representing Vaslui County
1987 - participation diploma at the Graphic Virtues of the Romanian Landscape national painting exhibition in Constanța
1988 - participation diploma at the Graphic Virtues of the Romanian Landscape national painting exhibition in Constanța
1989 - participation diploma at the Artur Verona national festival, Dorohoi, Botoșani County
In May 1997, at the 4th edition of The Bukovinian International Salon of Photography it was awarded the Vasile Hutopilǎ Special Award to one of the competitors, as a sign of gratitude to the Bukovinian Hutsul painter
May 7, 2002 - 1st place at The Holy Easter in Bukovina festival, for Byzantine icons, in Câmpulung Moldovenesc, South Bukovina, awarded by the Town Hall
December 2002 - participation diploma at the exhibition in honour of Câmpulung Moldovenesc being named health resort of national interest, awarded by the Town Hall
May 9, 2010 - 1st place at Il raduno mongolfiere in Calabria - Estemporanea di pittura, Santo Stefano di Rogliano (CS)

Exhibitions 
Some of Vasile Hutopila's exhibitions, from his debut exhibition, in 1975, to the most recent one, in 2003, as part of the important folklore festival Întâlniri bucovinene, which takes part each year in Poland, Romania, Ukraine, Hungary and Germany, reuniting the Poles, Hungarians, Germans, Romanians, Ukrainians, Slovaks, Czechs, Russians, who left from Bukovina and the ones who still live in Bukovina.
individual exhibitions
Câmpulung Moldovenesc (1975, 1979, 1981, 1995, 2003), of which, the most important in July 2003, as part of Întâlniri bucovinene / Bukowińskie Spotkania / Буковинські зустрічі festival, at the Wooden Art Museum in Câmpulung Moldovenesc, varnished by prof. dr. Ion Filipciuc, haiku poet
Brașov (1983, 1984)
Bucharest (1985)
Negrești, Vaslui County (1990, 1991, 1992, 1993, 1994)
Iași (1989)
group exhibitions
May 1983, Brașov
March 1984, Brașov
December 1986, Anuala '86, Vaslui
November 28–29, 1987, Virtuți plastice ale peisajului românesc, Constanța; vernissage by prof. Ion Sǎlișteanu, painter
December 1987, Anuala '87, Vaslui, at the Arta hall of the Ștefan cel Mare County Museum; vernissage by prof. Ion Sǎlișteanu, painter
June 6–12, 1988, Sǎptǎmâna culturii și educației socialiste, Negrești
1988, Virtuți plastice ale peisajului românesc, Constanța
December 1988, Anuala '88, Vaslui
March 21–30, 1989, Decada artelor, Vaslui, vernissage by art critic Valentin Ciucǎ
June 5–11, 1989, Sǎptǎmâna culturii și educației socialiste, Negrești
December 1989, Anuala '89, Vaslui, vernissage by art critic Valentin Ciucǎ
December 1990, Anuala '90, Vaslui
December 1992, Anuala '92, Vaslui
December 1993, Anuala '93, Vaslui
November 21–27, 1994, Sǎptǎmâna culturalǎ a orașului Negrești, Negrești; vernissage by Doina Rotaru
December 1994, Anuala '94, Vaslui
October 1–4, 1993, Negrești
November 29 - December 30, 1997, Salonul de toamnǎ târzie, Câmpulung Moldovenesc, vernissage by prof. dr. Ion Filipciuc, haiku poet
May 5–7, 2002, Sǎrbǎtoarea Sfintelor Paști în Bucovina, Câmpulung Moldovenesc
December, 2002, BTT, Câmpulung Moldovenesc
May 7–9, 2010, Il raduno mongolfiere in Calabria - mostra di pittura, in the historical centre of Santo Stefano di Rogliano (CS)

What art critics say 
Vasile Hutopila's paintings are a serene representation, a victory of the aesthetic truth, equivalent to the humanist love of the universe. Trembling of chromatic intensities, sensitively reduced in tonalities of grey colour in a trajectory of spirituality, of contemporary art. (Ion Vulcan, Bucharest 1987)
Vasile Hutopila is an abstemious who tends unto the chromatic asceticism and the essence of the purified structures. Situated at the junction between sketch and watercolour, his art is organically unitary and it has an attentively watched colour distribution. (Aurel Leon, Cronica, Iași 21 July 1989, after one of the rare watercolour exhibitions of Hutopilǎ, who usually uses oil on canvas technique)

Works in media and books
Graphics and cartoons in journals and magazines:
Oferta, Vaslui
To be, Câmpulung Moldovenesc
Gazeta de Câmpulung, Câmpulung Moldovenesc
Miezul lucrurilor, Câmpulung Moldovenesc

Graphics in books:
George Ungureanu, Pǎțania lui Pișpiricǎ, Brașov, 2003
Alexandru Bogza, Antinomii tonale, Biblioteca Miorița, Câmpulung Moldovenesc, 2006
Decebal Alexandru Seul, Muntele din beznă, Bacǎu, 2008

Mass Media 
You can see below some of the newspapers, magazines, TV channels and radio stations to which Vasile Hutopilǎ gave interviews, from the early '80s till present
newspapers
Karpatenrundschau, German newspaper in Brașov
Astra, Brașov
Drum nou, Brașov
Clopotul, Botoșani
Vremea nouǎ, Vaslui - the most part of the articles on Vasile Hutopilǎ
Zori noi, Suceava
Contemporanul, Bucharest
Cronica, Iași
Gazeta de Câmpulung, Câmpulung Moldovenesc
Crai nou, Suceava
Monitorul de Suceava, Suceava
Bucovina, Suceava
Oferta, Vaslui
Adevǎrul, Bucharest
Evenimentul, Iași
Mezzoeuro, Cosenza
Voce ai giovani Catanzaro
magazines
Gazeta de Câmpulung - Almanah 2002, Câmpulung Moldovenesc
Clubul Copiilor și Elevilor 40, Câmpulung Moldovenesc
TV broadcasting channels
TVR 1, the Romanian national television channel - 1989
TVR Iași - 1993, 1994
Agapia Elgy TV, Câmpulung Moldovenesc - 1995
radio stations
Radio Nord 100.7 FM, Câmpulung Moldovenesc - 2004, 2005

Countries in which there are paintings of Vasile Hutopilă in private collections 
France
Germany
Greece
Hungary
Israel
Italy
Japan
Netherlands
Norway
Palestina
Romania
Spain
Switzerland
United Arab Emirates
United States of America

See also 
Hutsuls
a list of Hutsul people
Bukovina
impressionism
Carpathian Mountains

External links 
article in Evenimentul, Romanian publication
another article in Evenimentul
article on Cornel Corcǎcel, Hutopilǎ's student in the early '90s
painter Neculai Codreanu
article in Crai Nou (Suceava)
another article in Crai Nou
recent article in Crai Nou
article in Evenimentul (Iasi)

1953 births
Living people
People from Suceava County
Hutsuls
Romanian people of Ukrainian descent
Romanian people of Rusyn descent
Romanian Impressionist painters